Fabian Funke (born 25 July 1997) is a German politician of the Social Democratic Party (SPD) who has been serving a member of the Bundestag since the 2021 elections, representing the Sächsische Schweiz-Osterzgebirge district.

Political career
In parliament, Funke has been serving on the Committee on European Affairs and the Committee on Human Rights and Humanitarian Aid.

In addition to his committee assignments, Funke has been a member of the German delegation to the Parliamentary Assembly of the Council of Europe (PACE) since 2022. In the Assembly, he serves on the Committee on Migration, Refugees and Displaced Persons and the Sub-Committee on External Relations.

Within his parliamentary group, Funke is part of a working group on integration and migration, chaired by Lars Castellucci. He also belongs to the Parliamentary Left, a left-wing movement within the SPD group.

References

External links 
 

Living people
1997 births
Politicians from Dresden
21st-century German politicians
Members of the Bundestag for the Social Democratic Party of Germany
Members of the Bundestag 2021–2025